Reflection is the twenty-eighth studio album by English musician Brian Eno, released on 1 January 2017 on Warp Records. It is a piece of generative ambient music produced by Eno, which plays indefinitely via an app, modulating its output at different times of the day. A pre-recorded version of the album is available on CD and vinyl, which runs for 54 minutes. Digital streaming versions of the album update on a seasonal basis. It was nominated for the 2017 Grammy Award for Best New Age Album.

Background
Reflection was released as part of Eno's series of ambient albums. Its structure is similar to that of Thursday Afternoon (1985), an earlier album of his that consists of a single track that runs for 60 minutes in length. Reflection has a length of 54 minutes. Eno decided on its title as the piece "makes [him] think back. It makes me think things over. It seems to create a psychological space that encourages internal conversation. And external ones actually—people seem to enjoy it as the background to their conversations". He considers the work the most sophisticated of all his ambient releases, and that the physical editions are a mere static excerpt of the "full" piece contained in the iOS app.

Release
On 1 January 2017, an album listening event was held at several Rough Trade shops worldwide. During the event, an edition of Reflection limited to 500 copies was available on CD, where each disc contained a "uniquely generated, one-of-a-kind" version of the piece inside of an autographed case sleeve.

Subsequently, 1 April, 1 July, and 9 October saw Eno release a new excerpt of the generative piece to streaming services Apple Music and Spotify, with varying lengths (the "autumn" iteration being 65:24 in length.) Each of these seasonal excerpts took the place of the previous version to represent the album. The generative iOS app also received updates on these same days.

Track listing
Written, recorded, and produced by Brian Eno.

Critical reception

Upon release, Reflection received positive reviews from critics. Writing for The Guardian, Kitty Empire wrote, "The overall effect is deeply, magnificently peaceful, meditative, even; ambient certainly monopolises certain sections of the thesaurus."

Personnel
Credits are adapted from the album's liner notes.

Brian Eno – writer, performer, producer

Additional personnel
Peter Chilvers – mutation software

Production
Matt Colton – mastering at Alchemy Studios
Brian Eno – cover image, photography
Nick Robertson – layout, design

Charts

References

External links
Official Eno and album website at Brian-Eno.net

2017 albums
Brian Eno albums
Albums produced by Brian Eno
Warp (record label) albums
Ambient albums by British artists